The Beacon is a luxury residential skyscraper in downtown Cleveland that began construction at 515 Euclid Avenue in late 2017 and was completed in late 2019. The Beacon sits at 29 floors; 8 floors of parking garage, 19 floors of one- and two-bedroom residential suites and rooftop lounge. 

Part of the need for the tower is due to the two-decade old resurgence of interest in downtown Cleveland. Residential population has gone up, spearheaded by a 77% increase of new housing units and 95% occupancy rate from 2000 to 2015. This surge in residential growth has seen nearly 15,000 people living in the Cleveland neighborhood as of 2017. That makes downtown Cleveland the largest populated downtown in Ohio (far ahead of Columbus, Cincinnati, and Akron) which illustrates the need for more housing capacity in the central location of Cleveland. It is the third-tallest residential building in the city behind the Terminal Tower, which was converted into a mixed-use residential building in 2019, and The 9 Cleveland.

Design
The tower is perched on an eight-story parking garage that was erected several years earlier for a project that never took off. This kept additional infrastructure costs down. The winning design that was presented to the Cleveland City Council was by Cleveland architecture firm of Westlake Reed Leskosky and the Boston firm NADAA.

The Beacon features a façade interlocked with colored interchanging metal panels that reflects the sun and brightly illuminates with exterior color progression from darker to lighter tones creating the impression of height and slenderness. The chosen site is notable because over ten years ago it was proposed that an apartment tower should sit on the lot behind the Huntington Building on East Roadway and Euclid. For various reasons, mostly due to financing and design flaws, that tower never rose. The Beacon is the first new residential high rise erected in Cleveland's central business district since 1974.

See also
 List of tallest buildings in Cleveland

References

External links
https://www.cleveland19.com/2019/11/05/first-look-inside-m-beacon-apartments-downtown-cleveland-photos/

Downtown Cleveland
Residential skyscrapers in Cleveland
Apartment buildings in Cleveland